A valley girl is a socioeconomic, linguistic, and youth subcultural stereotype and stock character originating during the 1980s: any materialistic upper-middle-class young woman, associated with unique vocal and California dialect features, from the Los Angeles commuter communities of the San Fernando Valley. The term in later years was more broadly applied to any female in the United States who embodied ditziness, airheadedness, or greater interest in conspicuous consumption than intellectual or personal accomplishment.

Valleyspeak
Valleyspeak or Valspeak is an American English social dialect and accompanying vocal features, best associated with Valley girls, though elements of it have spread to other demographics, including men called "Val dudes". This sociolect became an international fad for a certain period in the 1980s and 1990s, with a peak period from around 1981 to 1985. Valleyspeak is popularly characterized by both the steady use of uptalk and its vocabulary.

Language ideology 
Due to its place at the center of the entertainment industry, California is one of the main sources worldwide for new cultural and youth trends, including those of language. This lends itself to explicit language ideologies about dialects in the area as they receive more scrutiny than dialects in other nearby regions. Linguistic characteristics of valleyspeak are often thought to be "silly" and "superficial" and seen as a sign of low intelligence. Speakers are also often perceived as "materialistic" and "air-headed". The use of "like" or the quotative phrase "be like" are often ideologically linked to California and Valleyspeak despite the now-widespread use of the terms among youth, which results in them also receiving the "superficial" cast. In the national understanding, California speech is thought to be a product of the combination of Valley girl and surfer dude speech, and "is associated with good English, but never proper".

A study on regional language ideologies done in California in 2007 found that, despite its prevalence and association with California in past decades, Californians themselves do not consider "Valley girls" to be an overly prevalent social or linguistic group within the state. State residents listed factors such as immigrant populations and north–south regional slang as more relevant than Valleyspeak within the state.

Amanda Ritchart, a doctoral candidate studying linguistics at the University of California San Diego, analyzed 23-year-olds (college age students) from diverse socioeconomic backgrounds and ethnicities, specifically in the Southern California region. After this study, Ritchart once stated, "Women used uptalk more frequently than men did. Their pitch rose higher overall, and the rise began much later in the phrase." Even though the gender difference is notable, the majority of both men and women speak in uptalk in Southern California. In fact, 100% of the participants used uptalk when they asked a confirming question, such as "Go all the way to the right in the middle where it says Canyon Hills?"

According to the article "What's Up With Upspeak?", when women use Valleyspeak, it is assumed that they have "inferior speech" patterns. For men, the high rise of intonation usually "plateaued" at certain points, especially in situations where they didn't want to be interrupted.

Features and qualifiers  
The sound of Valleyspeak has these main habits: nasal sound; fast-paced run-on sentences; breathiness; uptalk, or the sound of a question; and vocal fry.
 High rising terminal (also called "up speak" or "uptalk") is a defining feature of Valleyspeak. Statements have a rising intonation, causing declarative language to appear interrogative to listeners unfamiliar with the dialect. Research on uptalk has found a number of pragmatic uses, including confirming that the interlocutor follows what is being said and indicating that the speaker has more to say and so their conversation partner should not interrupt them (also called "floor holding"). Another use is as a confirmation statement of general agreement, such as "I know, right?" or simply "right?". The difference between the intonation of a question, confirmation statements, and floor holding is determined by the extent of the rise and its location within the phrase. The high rising terminal feature has spread and been adopted outside the geographical area and groups originally associated with Valleyspeak including, in some cases, men.  (However, in some varieties of English,  usage of high rising terminal emerged independently and/or has been  documented as preceding Valleyspeak by decades, such as in Australian English and New Zealand English.)
 "Like" as a discourse marker. "Like" is used as a filler word, similar to "um" or "er", as in, "I'm, like, totally about to blow chunks." When "like" is functioning as a discourse marker, the word itself does not semantically change the phrase or sentence. Instead, it provides time for the speaker to formulate what they will say next. The word is always unstressed when used in this way. It is important to note that "like" does not always function as a discourse marker in Valspeak. Consider the following two sentences: "It was like 8 feet deep" and "I think that, like, it is entertaining." Even though both sentences contain the word "like," they employ it differently. In the former, "like" serves as an adverb that is synonymous with "approximately," whereas the latter "like" is a discourse marker, adding no additional meaning to the sentence. Furthermore, "like" is frequently used to introduce quoted speech. For example, a person can recount a conversation by stating, "So, um, I'm like 'Where did he go?' and she was um, like, 'I don't know, I haven't seen him.'"
 "To be like" as a colloquial quotative. "Like" (always unstressed) is used to indicate that what follows is not necessarily an exact quotation of what was said, but captures the meaning and intention of the quoted speech. As an example, in "And I was like, 'don't ever speak to my boyfriend again'", the speaker is indicating that they may or may not have literally said those words, but they conveyed that idea. "Be like" can introduce both a monologue or direct speech, allowing a speaker to express an attitude, reaction, or thought, or to use the phrase to signal quotation.
 Particular slang terms, including "to be all" or "to be all like" used in the same manner as "to be like", "whatever" or "as if" used to express any disbelief, "totally" meaning "quite" or "very", "seriously" as a frequent interjection of approval or an inquiry of veracity, "bitchin'" meaning "excellent", and "grody" meaning "dirty".
Vocal fry is characterized by "low, creaky vibrations" or a "guttural vibration". Researchers have studied two qualities of this speech pattern, such as the jitter (variation in pitch) and shimmer (variation in volume). When women tend to speak with these mannerisms, they are perceived as less competent, less hirable, less trustworthy, or less educated. Prominent examples are Kim Kardashian and Britney Spears.

In popular culture
 In Los Angeles, "vals" (inhabitants of "the Valley") were derided for their perceived other-ness in the late 1970s. Valspeak and the term "Valley Girl" were given a wider circulation with the release of a hit 1982 single by Frank Zappa titled "Valley Girl", on which his fourteen-year-old daughter Moon Zappa delivered a monologue in "Valleyspeak" behind the music. This song popularized phrases such as "grody to the max" and "gag me with a spoon". It also popularized the use of the term "like" as a discourse marker, though it did not originate in Valleyspeak. Zappa intended to lampoon the image, but after the song's release there was a significant increase in the "Valspeak" slang usage, whether ironically spoken or not.  Moon Zappa herself would go on to portray a Valley Girl in the "Speedway Fever" episode of CHiPs.
 An early appearance of Valleyspeak and the Valley Girl stereotype was through the character of Jennifer DiNuccio, played by Tracy Nelson in the 1982–1983 sitcom Square Pegs. According to an interview with Nelson included on the 2008 DVD release of the series, she developed the character's Valleyspeak and personality prior to the Zappa recording becoming popular.
 The 1983 film Valley Girl starring Nicolas Cage and Deborah Foreman centered on a group of "Valley Girl" characters and featured several characterizations associated with their lifestyle (such as going shopping at the mall or "Galleria," suntanning at the beach, and going to parties).
 In the 1990 animated TV series Tiny Toon Adventures there is a character named Shirley the Loon who is an anthropomorphic waterfowl. She speaks with a thick valley girl accent and is quite smart but also obsessed with New Age paraphernalia and also seems to have some magic abilities. She appears not to notice the other meaning of her surname as she often recites "oh, what a loon i am" while meditating.
 The protagonist of the 1995 film Clueless, played by Alicia Silverstone, has been described as a caricature of 1990s Valley Girls, though she is actually from nearby Beverly Hills.
 In the recurring Saturday Night Live sketch "The Californians", the characters speak with wildly exaggerated Valley accents.
 In her 2015 memoir entitled Wildflower, actress Drew Barrymore says she talks "like a Valley girl" because she lived in Sherman Oaks from the age of 7 to 14.

See also

 Bimbo
 Dumb blonde
 Essex girl
 Filler (linguistics)
 Julie Brown, among the performers from the era who personified and popularized the valley girl image
 Gap Girls and The Californians, Saturday Night Live sketches based on Valley people.
 Hookup culture
 Like (discourse particle)
 Clueless, a 1995 film that prominently features Valleyspeak
 Pink Five, a Star Wars parody fanfilm about a Valley girl character
 Preppy
 Sexy baby voice

References

External links
Janelle Tassone. "Buffy: The Evolution of a Valley Girl" Refractory: A Journal of Entertainment Media 2 (2003):
 Origins of Valspeak, YouTube video with Tracy Nelson from Square Pegs DVD commentary. Archived at Ghostarchive.org on 12 May 2022
Language Dossier, "American Slang: Valspeak." 
cs.utexas.edu: "Valspeak" text translator
Valspeak Translator
Blyth, C., Recktenwald, S., & Wang, J. (1990). I'm like, "Say What?!": A New Quotative in American Oral Narrative. American Speech, 65(3), 215–227. 
Bucholtz, M., Bermudez, N., Fung, V., Edwards, L., & Vargas, R. (2007). Hella Nor Cal or Totally So Cal?: The Perceptual Dialectology of California. Journal of English Linguistics, 35(4), 325–352. 
  Citing 
Ploschnitzki, P. (n.d.). " 'Valley girl' - A dialect, its stereotypes and the reality".
Ritchart, A. and Arvaniti, A., 2013. Do we all speak like valley girls? Uptalk in Southern Californian English. ASA Lay Language Papers.
Tschorn, A. (2007, August 19). You know her type.
Woo, M. (2015, April 30). Is Valley Girl Speak, Like, on the Rise? 
Wolf, N. (2015, July 24). Young women, give up the vocal fry and reclaim your strong female voice.

Class-related slurs
Slang terms for women
Female stock characters
San Fernando Valley
Culture of Los Angeles
California culture
Stereotypes of middle class women
Stereotypes of upper class women
Girl
1980s fads and trends
Stereotypes of white Americans
Stereotypes of white women
American slang
American English
Women in California
Socioeconomic stereotypes